Rodło Kwidzyn is a football club based in Kwidzyn (Poland). Currently they play in Poland V Liga.

Current squad

 Current squad

Honours & Achievements

Domestic

 1/16 Polish Cup (1): 1997/98

References

External links
Rodło official website (Polish)
Rodło at the 90minut.pl  website (Polish)
Ground: Stadion KCSiR (Polish)
Rodło at the Fans website (Polish)

Association football clubs established in 1946
1946 establishments in Poland
Kwidzyn County
Football clubs in Pomeranian Voivodeship